Obed Owusu Yeboah (born 26 July 1990) is a Ghanaian international footballer who plays as a striker for All Blacks.

Career
Owusu formerly played for Okwawu United, and later moved to All Blacks in January 2006.

International career
Owusu earned his first call-up to the Ghana national side on 12 September 2009, and made his international debut on 31 September 2009 against Argentina.

References
General

Specific

1990 births
Living people
Ghanaian footballers
Ghana international footballers
All Blacks F.C. players
Okwawu United players
Association football forwards